GTI Club: Rally Côte d'Azur is a racing video game developed and published by Konami for the arcades in 1996. It is the first game in the GTI Club series. It was re-released for PlayStation Network in 2008.

Gameplay
GTI Club: Rally Côte d'Azur is a game that lets players drive eight cars including the VW Golf GTI, Renault Le Car, and Mini Cooper, and the course winds through a European city. It is a street racing game with non-linear maps, allowing players to take shortcuts through alternative routes such as tunnels and back alleys.

Development and release
The first GTI Club game was released for the arcades in 1996 by Konami, on their new Cobra arcade board. Three models were released: a deluxe single-player cabinet, a dual sitdown cabinet, and a single-player sitdown cabinet. In the U.S., the deluxe model was released only in very limited numbers.

Reception
The game was a hit in arcades. In Japan, Game Machine listed GTI Club: Rally Côte d'Azur on their February 1, 1997 issue as being the third most-successful dedicated arcade game of the month.

Next Generation reviewed the arcade game, rating it four stars out of five, and stated that "in the end, GTI Club is a sufficiently immersive one-player game, but with a field in a Tag Race, it's a blast". Hyper magazine also rated it 4 out of 5 stars.

References

1996 video games
Arcade video games
Konami arcade games
Konami games
Racing video games
PlayStation Network games
Video games developed in Japan